Benjamin George Eyre (June 1, 1747July 11, 1789), was a figure of the American Revolutionary War. Eyre served as a Lieutenant Colonel in the Continental Army, commanding the Second Battalion of the Pennsylvania Militia.

Biography

Benjamin was the brother to Manuel and Jehu Eyre, also both major players in the Revolution. Apocryphally, his family was descended, through his father, from the royal House of Wessex.

The Eyre family as a whole played a pivotal role in the war (most notably through their invaluable contributions to the U.S. Navy, which they essentially founded) and Washington mentioned them several times in his personal correspondences.

Shipbuilder

Benjamin Eyre was commissioned by the Continental Congress to build the frigate General Greene, a service for which he was paid 56,561 pounds. Large contracts such as this one during the Revolutionary War era helped the Eyres' shipping company, Eyre and Massey, to become one of the largest in the world and bolstered the political and financial situation of the Eyre family.

Revolutionary
As aide-de-camp to General George Washington, he was so close to the future President that he was once given an expensive punch-bowl by him.  The punchbowl was loaned to the American Wing of New York's Metropolitan Museum in 1928 and donated by the surviving heirs in 1973.  A large color photo can be seen in the magazine American Heritage, August 1955.  The bowl depicted the China international trade and includes one of the first illustrations of the American flag, along with other international standards.  The Eyre brothers were major ship builders.

Legacy
A portrait of him standing alongside Washington can be found at Princeton University.

References

Eyre family
1747 births
1789 deaths
People from Burlington, New Jersey
Continental Army officers from New Jersey
People of colonial New Jersey
American people of English descent